A list of films produced in Turkey in 1974 (see 1974 in film):

See also
1974 in Turkey

References

Lists of Turkish films
1974